William Hanna Elder (24 December 1913, Oak Park, Illinois – 14 August 2006, Columbia, Missouri) was a zoology professor, who worked in "wildlife management, range and wildlife habitat management, ornithology, and mammalogy". He was a Guggenheim Fellow for the academic year 1956–1957.

Education and career
Elder graduated from the University of Wisconsin in 1936 with a bachelor's degree in science education, in 1938 with a master's degree, and in 1942 with a Ph.D. in zoology.

Elder worked from 1941 to 1943 as a game biologist for the Illinois Natural History Survey and from 1943 to 1945 as a pharmacologist doing research in chemical warfare in the University of Chicago's Toxicity Laboratory. At the University of Missouri's department of zoology he was from 1945 to 1947 an assistant professor, from 1947 to 1951 an associate professor, and from 1951 to 1984 a full professor, retiring as professor emeritus in 1984. He also chaired the department from 1950 to 1953 and was named the William J. Rucker Professor of Zoology in 1954.

Elder discovered that anticholesterol compound SC-12937 (22, 25-diazacholestanol dihydrochloride) reduced fertility in captive pigeons. In 1964 he received patent rights for an oral chemosterilant for feral pigeons and other nuisance birds. The patent was first assigned to the University of Missouri and licensed to G. D. Searle and Company and then assigned to the Avitrol Corporation headquartered in Tulsa, Oklahoma. In 1967 Wofford and Elder published their field tests of the chemosterilant.

Family
In 1941 Elder married Nina Leopold, the older daughter of naturalist and conservationist Aldo Leopold. Together they studied birds, bats, and other wildlife in Illinois and Missouri. They had two daughters. Accompanied by their daughters, the Elders studied the endangered Nene goose in Hawaii, elephants in Zambia and Rhodesia (now Zimbabwe), and waterbuck in Botswana. Nina Elder assisted in the scientific fieldwork. After divorcing his first wife, Elder married Glennis Fast in 1973.

Selected publications

References

1913 births
2006 deaths
Writers from Oak Park, Illinois
20th-century American zoologists
21st-century American zoologists
University of Wisconsin–Madison alumni
University of Missouri alumni
Scientists from Illinois